Rock All Night is a 1957 crime drama film produced and directed by Roger Corman. Distributed by American International Pictures, it is based on a 25-minute television episode of The Jane Wyman Show from 1955 called "The Little Guy." It stars Dick Miller, Russell Johnson and Abby Dalton. It co-stars Mel Welles, Ed Nelson and Clegg Hoyt. The film was released as a double feature with Dragstrip Girl.

Plot
Two escaping killers hide out in a club called the Cloud Nine and hold the bartender and clients hostage.  Amongst the patrons are a nervous singer (Abby Dalton), a boxer, his wife, and manager, an extortionist, a loud thug and his girlfriend, as well as a small man who can determine people's real (as opposed to posed) personalities and has no fear (Dick Miller).

Cast
 Abby Dalton as Julie
 Dick Miller as "Shorty"
 Russell Johnson as "Jigger"
 Mel Welles as Sir Bop
 Ed Nelson as Pete
 Clegg Hoyt as Marty
 Jeanne Cooper as Mabel
 Barboura Morris as Syl
 Chris Alcaide as Angie
 Richard Karlan as Jerry
 Bruno VeSota as Charlie

The Little Guy
The film was based on a TV play The Little Guy which aired on Jane Wyman Presents The Fireside Theatre in September 1955. It was directed by Don Weis.

Production
Dane Clark signed on to star in July 1955, after having just appeared in a stage production where his leading lady died in his arms.

Accolades
The production earned Don Weis the Screen Directors Guild Award for Best Director of a TV Play in 1955.

Production
In October 1956 Roger Corman bought the rights to "Little Guy" from Jane Wyman for his production company Sunset Productions. Dane Clark was originally sought to play the lead.
 
Corman gave the script to Charles B. Griffith to expand into a feature. Mel Welles later claimed Corman wanted Griffith to turn the story "into a rock script to emulate the success of Rock Around the Clock and all those pictures were having."

According to one account, Griffith says he wrote the script over the weekend:
I cut it up with a pair of scissors, this original screenplay, and added new characters like Sir Bop, which was to be played by Lord Buckley, but Mel Welles ended up playing it because Buckley was out of town. Mel wrote his own “hiptionary” for sale in the theatre to go with it. Dick Miller was in the Dane Clark part. He was the little guy of the title. The music was by Buck Ram, The Platters and those people all doing their hit songs. Of course, no songs were written in 24 hours... I would just put down “musical number here”. The girl has her dialogue with the guys and then turns around to sing a song. It was up to them what she sang, up to Roger.
According to another account, what happened was two days before filming there was a change in the schedule of The Platters and they were only going to be available for one day so Griffith rewrote the script in 48 hours.
 
The film was at one stage known as Rock'n'Roll Girl.

Songwriter and manager Buck Ram offered a slew of his musical talent such as The Platters, accompanied by the Eddie Beal sextet with Eric Dolphy on baritone saxophone, The Blockbusters, and Nora Hayes to AIP in return for having the sole rights to a soundtrack album for the film. Corman filmed Ram's acts lip-synching their tunes on a separate set that comprise the beginning of the film. Rock All Night was made in five days and originally appeared as a double feature with Dragstrip Girl.

Comedian Lord Buckley had planned to be in the film, but when he was unavailable, one of Corman's stock company and a writer for Buckley, Mel Welles imitated Buckley in the role of "Sir Bop". Corman was worried no one would understand what Wells was saying so Wells wrote a dictionary of hip talk for the film.

Dick Miller, a former Navy boxing champion, played the role Dane Clark did in the television show, with Russell Johnson playing the role that Lee Marvin originated.

Despite the short shooting schedule and minimal locations (only two sets), Corman always regarded the movie as a personal favourite.

Quentin Tarantino
In 1993 Showtime announced they would remake a number of AIP films of the 1950s. Quentin Tarantino was to do a remake of Rock All Night. However the film was never made.

Robert Rodriguez got the idea to make Grindhouse after seeing a poster on Quentin Tarantino's wall advertising Rock All Night and Dragstrip Girl.

Notes

See also
 List of American films of 1957

References
 Corman, Roger and Jerome, Jim How I Made a Hundred Movies in Hollywood and Never Lost a Dime 1998 Da Capo Press
 Naha, Ed The Films of Roger Corman: Brilliance on a Budget 1984 Olympic Marketing

External links
 
The Little Guy TV Show at IMDb
Review of film at Variety

1957 films
American International Pictures films
1950s English-language films
Films directed by Roger Corman
Films produced by Roger Corman
Films with screenplays by Charles B. Griffith
Films based on television plays